Forever Black is the fifth studio album by the American heavy metal band Cirith Ungol. It was released on April 24, 2020, and is the band's first studio album since its reunion in 2016, and its first studio album since Paradise Lost in 1991. Metal Hammer named it the 42nd-best metal album of 2020.

Track listing

Charts

References

2020 albums
Cirith Ungol albums
Metal Blade Records albums